Zabrodsky is a surname. Notable people with the surname include:
Hagit Zabrodsky, Israeli computer scientist
Oldřich Zábrodský (1926–2015), Czech ice hockey player
Stanislav Zabrodsky (born 1962), Ukrainian archer
Vladimír Zábrodský (1923–2020), Czech ice hockey player